Double Arch is a close-set pair of natural arches in Arches National Park in southern Grand County, Utah, United States, that is one of the more known features of the park.

Description

The Double Arch parking area is a  round trip to the arches that may be wheelchair accessible, with assistance. No guardrails or fences prevent visitors from exploring directly beneath and through the arches.

Double Arch was formed differently from most of the arches in the park. It is what is known as a pothole arch, formed by water erosion from above rather than more typical erosion from the side. These dimensions give the arch the tallest opening and second-longest span in the park.

The area was used as a backdrop for the opening scene of Indiana Jones and the Last Crusade, in which the arches are briefly visible. However, the cave shown in the movie does not exist.

Gallery

See also

References

External links

 Information on Double Arch at The Natural Arch and Bridge Society

Natural arches of Utah
Natural arches of Grand County, Utah
Arches National Park